Dzoraglukh is a village in the Aparan Municipality of the Aragatsotn Province of Armenia. The town's church, dedicated to Saint Hovhannes (Saint John), dates from the 10th to the 12th century.

References 

Populated places in Aragatsotn Province